The National Mining Museum is dedicated to showcasing Zimbabwe's mining heritage. It was developed by the National Museums and Monuments of Zimbabwe.   The museum is located in Kwekwe, a town in central Zimbabwe.

References 

Kwekwe
Mining museums in Zimbabwe
Buildings and structures in Midlands Province